High Haswell is a village in County Durham, in England. It is situated close to Haswell, a few miles to the east of Durham.

External links

Villages in County Durham
Haswell, County Durham